Manpreet Singh Badal (born 26 July 1962) is an Indian politician and leader of the Bharatiya Janata Party. He is the former Finance Minister of Punjab. He resigned from Indian National Congress on 18 January 2023 and joined BJP the same day.

He has been member of Punjab Legislative Assembly five times (1995, 1997, 2002, 2007, 2017), and has been finance minister twice. His first stint as Finance Minister was in the government led by Parkash Singh Badal from 2007 to 2010. This was his second stint as Finance Minister. He has presented the Punjab budget a record nine times — the maximum for any minister in Punjab.

Early life
Manpreet Singh Badal was born on 26 July 1962 in Muktsar. He is the son of Gurdas Singh Badal, the brother of former Punjab Chief Minister Parkash Singh Badal, and Harmandir Kaur Badal, who died on 19 March 2020 at the age of 84. Manpreet Singh Badal attended The Doon School and St. Stephen's College, University of Delhi. He is fluent in English, Punjabi, Hindi, and Urdu. He was subsequently awarded a law degree by the University of London.

Shiromani Akali Dal
He was elected to the Punjab Legislative Assembly in May 1995 on an Akali Dal ticket from Gidderbaha. He was re-elected from Gidderbaha constituency in 1997, 2002 and 2007. In 2007 he was made finance minister in Parkash Singh Badal government. He was removed from this post following differences about debt waiver offer from the Centre with the rest of party. Subsequently, he was expelled from the Shiromani Akali Dal (SAD) in October 2010.

People's Party of Punjab
In 2011, he formed a new political party called People's Party of Punjab. In the 2012 Punjab elections, his party formed political alliance with CPI, CPM and Shiromani Akali Dal (Longowal) with Badal as their candidate for the office of chief minister. He contested the elections from the Gidderbaha and Maur constituencies, losing from both seats.

On 15 January 2016 Manpreet merged his party with the Congress.

Indian National Congress
After merging his party with the Indian National Congress, he was awarded the party ticket to contest from Bathinda Urban constituency. He won the seat defeating his rival from the Aam Aadmi Party by 18,480 votes in the Punjab assembly elections held in March 2017. In 2022 elections he lost the seat to Aam Aadmi party by 63,581 votes which is the highest margin lost by any candidate in entire Punjab elections of 2022.[23]. He resigned from Indian National Congress on 18 January 2023.

Bhartiya Janata Party
Manpreet Singh Badal quit the Indian National Congress and joined the Bhartiya Janata Party (BJP) on 19 January 2023.

Family
He is married to Vinu Badal, and he has a son and a daughter.

References

Punjabi people
Living people
Finance Ministers of Punjab, India
Punjab, India MLAs 1992–1997
Punjab, India MLAs 1997–2002
Punjab, India MLAs 2002–2007
Punjab, India MLAs 2007–2012
The Doon School alumni
St. Stephen's College, Delhi alumni
Alumni of the University of London
1962 births
Indian National Congress politicians from Punjab, India
Shiromani Akali Dal politicians
Punjab, India MLAs 2017–2022
Bharatiya Janata Party politicians from Punjab